The 2021 Super Rugby Aotearoa season (branded as Sky Super Rugby Aotearoa for sponsorship reasons) was a professional club rugby union tournament organised by New Zealand Rugby. Announced on 11 November 2020, the tournament was the second season of Super Rugby Aotearoa, featuring the 5 New Zealand Super Rugby sides, ran from 26 February to 8 May 2021.

The tournament ran parallel to Australia's 2021 Super Rugby AU season, and Super Rugby Trans-Tasman followed the conclusion of both seasons, a crossover tournament featuring each Australian team playing each New Zealand team once, followed by a final.

Law variations 

The 2021 Super Rugby Aotearoa season will see further law variations, furthering those brought in during the 2020 season. Goal-line drop outs will be brought in for when an attacking player is held up or knocks the ball on in goal. When a kick is forced in goal by the defending team then a goal-line drop out will also take place. These rules were used successfully in the Australian 2020 Super Rugby AU season. Extra time was also be used again in 2021, again consisting of a  10-minute period, however differing from the 2021 Super Rugby AU season, the team scoring the first points of any kind in this period will win the match.

A captain's referral has also been brought in for 2021, similar to those used successfully in cricket and tennis, with New Zealand Rugby becoming the first to trial it in rugby union. Each team will be allowed one referral per match which can be used in one of three scenarios: a decision occurring in the final five minutes of a match, an offence in the build up to a try being scored or an act of foul play. All other law variations from the 2020 season will again be used in the 2021 season.

Standings

Round-by-round
The table below shows the progression of all teams throughout the 2021 Super Rugby Aotearoa season. Each team's tournament points on the standings log is shown for each round, with the overall log position in brackets.

Matches

Round 1

Round 2

Round 3

Round 4

Round 5

Round 6

Round 7

Round 8

Round 9

Round 10

Final

Notes

Statistics

Leading point scorers

Source: Points

Leading try scorers

Source: Tries

Discipline

Players

Squads

The following 2021 Super Rugby Aotearoa squads have been named. Players listed in italics denote non-original squad members.

Referees
The following referees were selected to officiate the 2021 Super Rugby Aotearoa season:

References

External links 

 

2021 Super Rugby season
2021 in New Zealand rugby union
2021 rugby union tournaments for clubs